The Hanover Barons are a junior ice hockey team based in Hanover, Ontario, Canada.  They play out of the Provincial Junior Hockey League - Pollock Division.  The Barons spent the 2009-10 season in the neighbouring town of Durham, Ontario while their new arena was being built in Hanover.

History
The Hanover Hurricanes originated in the Western Junior C Hockey League in the mid-1960s.  In 1968, they made the jump to the Western Junior D Hockey League, only to return not long after.

The Barons had no shortage of tough competition in the 1970s, in the 1976-77 season the Barons were completely winless as the Listowel Cyclones dominated the league and were champions that year.  According to the Owen Sound Sun Times, on February 16, 1977 the Barons were defeated by the New Hamburg Hahns by a score of 34-0 and outshot 109 to 13.

In the 1980s, the league became the Grey-Bruce Junior "C" Hockey League.  In 1984-85, the Barons came together and had a perfect season.  With 28 wins in 30 games and 2 ties, the Barons went on to win their first league title since 1971.  In 1985, the Barons took over the league and held them hostage for the next nine seasons.  In 1988, the league became the Western Junior "C" Hockey League.

In 1989, the Barons made it to the All-Ontario Final and lost to the Bradford Bulls 4-games-to-2.  In 1991, the Barons won their first and only Clarence Schmalz Cup as All-Ontario Champions, defeating the Orangeville Crushers 4-games-to-3.  In 1993, the Barons made it to the Final again and lost out to the Napanee Raiders 4-games-to-2.

In recent years, the Barons have been stuck behind two very powerful teams.  The Wingham Ironmen and the Kincardine Bulldogs do not leave a lot of breathing room for the other teams in the league and for at least the past few seasons have kept the Barons out of those top two spots.

In the 2004-05 regular season, the Barons finished in third place.  In the playoff semi-final they drew the Kincardine Bulldogs who defeated them 4-games-to-1.

The 2005-06 season saw the Barons finish off in third place, they drew the sixth seeded Mount Forest Patriots in a best-of-3 series for the league quarter-final.  The Barons finished off the Patriots 2-games-to-none.  In the semi-final, the Barons found themselves against the second seeded Kincardine Bulldogs.  The Barons were defeated 4-games-to-none by the eventual league champions.

In 2006-07, the Barons finished the regular season in fourth place as a late season surge by the Walkerton Hawks displaced them from their characteristic third seed.  In a best-of-5 quarter-final, the Barons drew the Mount Forest Patriots and defeated them 3-games-to-1.  In the semi-final, the Barons were put up against the top seeded Kincardine Bulldogs but lost the series 4-games-to-1.

For the 2009-10 season, the Barons played in neighbouring Durham, Ontario while awaiting the building of their new arena in Hanover.

Season-by-season standings

(*) The 1999-00 Season was altered drastically due to the folding of the Lakeshore Pirates.  As a disproportionate number of games had been played by each team against Lakeshore, all history of these games were erased.
1974-1981 & 1982-1996
1981-1982
1996-2004
2004–Present

Clarence Schmalz Cup appearances
1989: Bradford Bulls defeated Hanover Barons 4-games-to-2
1991: Hanover Barons defeated Orangeville Crushers 4-games-to-3
1993: Napanee Raiders defeated Hanover Barons 4-games-to-2

Notable alumni
Jeff MacMillan
Jordan Willis
Kevin Pollock (NHL referee)
Rob Hellyer (NLL Player)

References

External links
Barons Webpage

Ice hockey teams in Ontario